A slide rule scale is a line with graduated markings  inscribed along the length of a slide rule used for mathematical calculations. The earliest such device had a single logarithmic scale for performing multiplication and division but soon an improved technique was developed which involved two such scales sliding alongside each other – hence the name slide rule (colloquially called a slipstick in the United States). Later, multiple scales were provided with the most basic being logarithmic but with others graduated according to the mathematical function required.

Few slide rules have been designed for addition and subtraction, rather the main scales are used for multiplication and division and the other scales are for mathematical calculations involving trigonometric, exponential and, generally, transcendental functions. Before they were superseded by electronic calculators in the 1970s slide rules were an important type of portable calculating instrument.

Slide rule design

A slide rule consists of a body and a slider that can be slid along within the body and both these have numerical scales inscribed on them. On duplex rules the body and/or the slider have scales on the back as well as the front. The slider's scales may be visible from the back or the slider may need to be slid right out and replaced facing the other way round. A cursor (also called runner or glass) containing one (or more) hairlines may be slid along the whole rule so that corresponding readings, front and back, can be taken from the various scales on the body and slider.

In about 1620 Edmund Gunter introduced what is now known as Gunter's line as one element of the Gunter's sector he invented for mariners. The line, inscribed on wood, was a single logarithmic scale going from 1 to 100. It had no sliding parts but by using a pair of dividers it was possible to multiply and divide numbers. The form with a single logarithmic scale eventually developed into such instruments as Fuller's cylindrical slide rule. In about 1622, but not published until 1632, William Oughtred invented linear and circular slide rules which had two logarithmic scales that slid beside each other to perform calculations. In 1654 the linear design was developed into a wooden body within which a slider could be fitted and adjusted.

Scales

Simple slide rules will have a C and D scale for multiplication and division, most likely an A and B for squares and square roots, and possibly CI and K for reciprocals and cubes. In the early days of slide rules few scales were provided and no labelling was necessary. However, gradually the number of scales tended to increase. Amédée Mannheim introduced the A, B, C and D labels in 1859 and, after that, manufacturers began to adopt a somewhat standardised, though idiosyncratic, system of labels so the various scales could be quickly identified.

Advanced slide rules have many scales and they are often designed with particular types of user in mind, for example electrical engineers or surveyors. 
There are rarely scales for addition and subtraction but a workaround is possible.
Front: LL00, LL01, LL02, LL03, DF (on the slider CF, CIF, L, CI, C) D, LL3, LL2, LL1 and LL00. Back: H2, Sh2, Th, K, A (on the slider B, T, ST, S, P, C) D, DI, Ch, Sh1, H1.

Notes about table
 Some scales have high values at the left and low on the right. These are marked as "decrease" in the table above. On slide rules these are often inscribed in red rather than black or they may have arrows pointing left along the scale. See P and DI scales in detail image.
 In slide rule terminology, "folded" means a scale that starts and finishes at values offset from a power of 10. Often folded scales start at π but may be extended lengthways to, say, 3.0 and 35.0.
 For mathematical reasons some scales either stop short of or extend beyond the D = 1 and 10 points. For example, arctanh(x) approaches ∞ (infinity) as x'' approaches 1, so the scale stops short.
 In slide rule terminology "log-log" means the scale is logarithmic applied over an inherently logarithmic scale.
 Slide rule annotation generally ignores powers of 10. However for some scales, such as log-log, decimal points are relevant and are likely to be marked.

Gauge marks

A cursor may have subsidiary hairlines beside the main one. For example when one is over kilowatts the other indicates horsepower. The Aristo 0972 has multiple cursor hairlines on its reverse side, as shown in the image above.

Notes

References

Citations

Works cited

Further reading

Analog computers
Historical scientific instruments
Mechanical calculators
Logarithms
Logarithmic scales of measurement